The Rural Municipality of Wood River No. 74 is a rural municipality (RM) in the Canadian province of Saskatchewan within Census Division No. 3 and  Division No. 2. It is located in the southwest portion of the province.

History 
The RM of Wood River No. 74 incorporated as a rural municipality on December 9, 1912.

Geography

Communities and localities 
The following unincorporated communities are within the RM.

Localities
 Lafleche
 Melaval
 Woodrow

Parks 
 Thomson Lake Regional Park

Demographics 

Government 
The RM of Wood River No. 74 is governed by an elected municipal council and an appointed administrator that meets on the second Tuesday of every month. The reeve of the RM is David Sproule while its administrator is Brekke Massé. The RM's office is located in Lafleche.

References 

 
Wood River
Division No. 3, Saskatchewan